Indicators of spatial association are statistics that evaluate the existence of clusters in the spatial arrangement of a given variable. For instance, if we are studying cancer rates among census tracts in a given city local clusters in the rates mean that there are areas that have higher or lower rates than is to be expected by chance alone; that is, the values occurring are above or below those of a random distribution in space.

Global indicators
Notable global indicators of spatial association include:

 Global Moran's I: The most commonly used measure of global spatial autocorrelation or the overall clustering of the spatial data developed by Patrick Alfred Pierce Moran.
 Geary's C (Geary's Contiguity Ratio): A measure of global spatial autocorrelation developed by Geary in 1954. It is inversely related to Moran's I, but more sensitive to local autocorrelation than Moran's I.
 Getis–Ord G (Getis–Ord global G, Geleral G-Statistic): Introduced by Getis and Ord in 1992 to supplement Moran's I.

Local indicators
Notable local indicators of spatial association (LISA) include:

 Local Moran's I: Derived from Global Moran's I, it was introduced by Luc Anselin in 1995 and can be computed using GeoDa.
 Getis–Ord Gi (local Gi): Developed by Getis and Ord based on their global G.
 INDICATE's IN: Originally developed to assess the spatial behaviour of stars, can be computed for any discrete 2+D dataset using python-based INDICATE tool available from GitHub.

See also
 Spatial analysis
 Tobler's first law of geography

References

Further reading 
 

Spatial analysis